Transmembrane protein 150B is a protein that in humans is encoded by the TMEM150B gene.

Function
The protein belongs to the DRAM (damage-regulated autophagy modulator) family of membrane-spanning proteins. Alternate splicing results in multiple transcript variants. [provided by RefSeq, Aug 2013].

References

Further reading 

Human proteins